Robbie Butler  (born 16 April 1972) is a Unionist politician from Northern Ireland, who has been the Deputy Leader of the Ulster Unionist Party (UUP) since May 2021. He has been  a  Member of the Northern Ireland Assembly (MLA) for Lagan Valley since May 2016. 

He is the Ulster Unionist Party's representative for Mental Health and for Education. He is an officer in the Boys' Brigade at 1st Magheragall.

Before entering politics, Butler worked as a butcher from the age of 16, became a prison officer in 1996 and then a firefighter in 2000.

Butler was a UUP candidate in the 2014 local elections for Lisburn and Castlereagh Council. He stood in the Killultagh electoral area and was elected as a councillor with 18.2% of the vote. He was the UUP candidate for Lagan Valley in the 2017 general election, polling 16.8% of the vote. He stood again in the 2019 election, polling 19.0%. 

Following Steve Aiken's resignation as leader of the UUP, Butler was reported to be "giving serious consideration" around standing for the party leadership. Butler decided not to stand, and Doug Beattie was elected unopposed.

On 24 May 2021, in addition to his existing role as party chief whip, Butler was appointed deputy leader of the UUP.

References

External links
Lagan Valley constituency profile, BBC News; accessed 4 November 2016.
Northern Ireland Assembly profile
Ulster Unionist Party profile

1972 births
Living people
Ulster Unionist Party MLAs
Northern Ireland MLAs 2016–2017
Northern Ireland MLAs 2017–2022
Place of birth missing (living people)
Northern Ireland MLAs 2022–2027